Michael Cardozo may refer to:
Michael A. Cardozo (born 1941), current Corporation Counsel for New York City
Michael H. Cardozo (1910–1996), American lawyer